John Martin James (10 May 1914 – 27 January 2002) was a British racing driver from England. He competed in one Formula One World Championship Grand Prix. James was an engineer who acquired a Maserati 4CLT/48, and entered the 1951 British Grand Prix, retiring from a damaged radiator after 23 laps. Regulation changes for  limited his Maserati to competing in Formula Libre only, and he competed in several sprint races before retiring from racing.

Complete Formula One World Championship results
(key)

References 

English racing drivers
English Formula One drivers
1914 births
2002 deaths